Charles Bonnell Ward (April 27, 1879 – May 27, 1946) was a U.S. Representative from New York.

Born in Newark, New Jersey, Ward attended the public schools and was graduated from Pennsylvania Military College (now Widener University) in 1899.
He moved to New York and settled in Debruce.
He engaged in agricultural pursuits.
He was editor and owner of the Liberty Register at Liberty, New York from 1910 to 1928.

Ward was elected as a Republican to the Sixty-fourth and to the four succeeding Congresses (March 4, 1915 – March 3, 1925).
He declined to be a candidate for reelection in 1924 to the Sixty-ninth Congress.
He resumed agricultural pursuits.
He was owner and operator of the De Bruce Club Inn until his death.
He died at Liberty, New York, May 27, 1946.
He was interred in Mount Pleasant Cemetery, Newark, New Jersey.

Sources

1879 births
1946 deaths
Politicians from Newark, New Jersey
People from Liberty, New York
Widener University alumni
Republican Party members of the United States House of Representatives from New York (state)